is a Japanese electrophysiologist and Former Chair in Department of Physiology and Biophysics, Kyoto University, Kyoto, Japan.  He is currently also a member of F1000.  Prof. Akinori Noma has made many significant contributions to physiology including the discovery of the KATP ion channel.

References

Year of birth missing (living people)
Living people
Electrophysiologists
Japanese scientists